Tom Davidson (born 3 February 1983) is a former Australian rules footballer who was recruited from the Geelong Falcons in the 2001 AFL Draft by the Collingwood Football Club.

His career was hindered by two serious knee injuries, the first during the 2003 preseason, and the second in his first and only Australian Football League (AFL) game in April 2004. He was delisted by Collingwood at the end of the 2005 season, but drafted by in the 2006 rookie draft by the Western Bulldogs, but never again played senior football.

He is the son of former Richmond and Geelong footballer Garry Davidson.

Davidson currently owns and runs Patch Cafe in Richmond.

References

External links

Living people
1983 births
Collingwood Football Club players
Australian rules footballers from Victoria (Australia)
Geelong Falcons players